Mona Hopton Bell (1867–1940) was a British artist, best known for her portraits of civic figures.

She was the grandmother of the painter Jean H. Bell.

References

External links

1867 births
1940 deaths
19th-century British women artists
20th-century British women artists
British women painters